Waughop Lake is a lake less than 1.6 km (1.0 mi) east of Steilacoom in Pierce County, Washington, United States. The lake lies within Fort Steilacoom Park, in the city of Lakewood, Washington. The lake is fed by groundwater and has no surface drainage channels.

The lake is named after Dr. John Wesley Waughop, former superintendent of the Washington State Hospital for the Insane. The hospital, now known as Western State Hospital, lies across from the park on Steilacoom Boulevard SW. Remnants of part of the hospital are incorporated into the trail. The lake is circled by a 9/10-mile paved loop trail.

Waughop Lake is refilled with trout that, unless caught, die within a few weeks. One of the primary researchers of this lake, Michele La Fontaine, has done studies on the algae and dissolved oxygen content. The depth fluctuates about 2 feet a year, gaining 2 feet in winter and losing 2 feet due to evaporation.

Life 
Waughop Lake is home to many animals and plants, including mallards, deer, Canada geese, raccoons, robins, squirrels, and other small birds.

Algae 

Algae in Waughop Lake has affected the lake for a long time. The algae are fed by nitrogen, supplied by the duck droppings and sediment, which the lake has plenty of. There are serious algae blooms, and it is not advisable to come into contact with the water. During algae blooms, the lake may be closed or restricted to visitors. For some of the year, fishing is restricted due to the algae problem. The bulk of the algae is green cyanobacteria, a phylum or waterborne photosynthesizing prokaryotes.

External links
Chambers-Clover Basin Instream Resources Protection Program (PDF)
VR Seattle Panorama of Waughop Lake (requires QuickTime)
Waughop, Dr. John Wesley (1839-1903) at HistoryLink.org

Waughop
Lakes of Pierce County, Washington
Protected areas of Pierce County, Washington